Wallage is a surname. Notable people with the surname include:

 Jacques Wallage (born 1946), Dutch politician and sociologist
 Stanley Wallage (1895–1926), British flying ace

See also
 Wallace (surname)

English-language surnames